Essential is a 1998 compilation album by Pet Shop Boys, released as a limited edition in the United States by EMI/Capitol and in Japan by Toshiba/EMI.  Produced for only six months, early promotional versions of the album had the title Early, as the tracks featured were part of Pet Shop Boys' early catalogue.  The album contained remixes as well as album tracks and B-sides. The CD booklet contains an essay written by music journalist and Pet Shop Boys biographer Chris Heath.

While several of the selections had not been available on compact disc prior to its original release, as of 2018, it remains the only official CD appearance of the 7" version of "That's My Impression" (all other reissues and compilations using the "Disco" mix.)

Track listing

Personnel 

 Evren Göknar - Mastering Engineer

Certifications

References

Pet Shop Boys compilation albums
1998 compilation albums